The 1906 Saint Louis Blue and White football team was an American football team that represented Saint Louis University as an independent during the 1906 college football season. In its first season under head coach Eddie Cochems, the team compiled a perfect 11–0 record and outscored opponents by a total of 407 to 11.

The forward pass became legal in 1906, and Saint Louis is credited by some with having thrown the first legal forward pass in a September 5, 1906, game against Carroll College. Football authority and College Football Hall of Fame coach David M. Nelson wrote that "E. B. Cochems is to forward passing what the Wright brothers are to aviation and Thomas Edison is to the electric light." Halfback Bradbury Robinson led the team's early passing attack.

Schedule

References

Saint Louis
Saint Louis Billikens football seasons
College football undefeated seasons
Saint Louis Blue and White football